Muskingum Township, Ohio may refer to:
Muskingum Township, Muskingum County, Ohio
Muskingum Township, Washington County, Ohio

Ohio township disambiguation pages